Advanced packaging is the aggregation and interconnection of components before traditional integrated circuit packaging.  Advanced packaging allows multiple devices (electrical, mechanical, or semiconductor) to be merged and packaged as a single electronic device.  Unlike traditional integrated circuit packaging, advanced packaging employs processes and techniques that are performed at semiconductor fabrication facilities.  Advanced packaging thus sits between fabrication and traditional packaging -- or, in other terminology, between BEoL and post-fab.  Advanced packaging includes multi-chip modules, 3D ICs, 2.5D ICs, heterogeneous integration, fan-out wafer-level packaging, system-in-package, quilt packaging, combining logic (processors) and memory in a single package, die stacking, several chiplets or dies in a package, combinations of these techniques, and others.

Advanced packaging can help achieve performance gains through the integration of several devices in one package and associated efficiency gains (by reducing the distances signals have to travel, in other words reducing signal paths), and allowing for high numbers of connections between devices, without having to resort to smaller transistors which have become increasingly more difficult to manufacture.

References

Semiconductor technology